Swap arrangement may refer to:

 Currency swap
 Central bank liquidity swap
 Stock swap
 Prisoner exchange